Charles Harbord, 5th Baron Suffield  (2 January 1830 – 9 April 1914), was a British peer, courtier and Liberal politician. A close friend of Edward VII, he served as a Lord of the Bedchamber and Lord-in-waiting to the King. He also held political office as Master of the Buckhounds under William Gladstone between February and July 1886.

Background and education
Harbord was a son of Edward Harbord, 3rd Baron Suffield. He was educated at King's College School. His father died in 1835 and in 1853, his childless, elder half-brother (his father's successor) died and Harbord inherited the title.

Political career

Lord Suffield was appointed a Lord-in-waiting in 1868 in William Gladstone's first administration, a post he held until 1872. The latter year he was appointed Lord of the Bedchamber to the Prince of Wales, to whom he was a close friend. He was Chief of Staff to the Prince of Wales during the Prince's expedition to India in 1875–1876. He did not serve in Gladstone's second administration but was briefly Master of the Buckhounds from February to July 1886 in Gladstone's third administration. He was sworn of the Privy Council in February 1886. He remained Lord of the Bedchamber until 1901, when on the Prince of Wales's accession to the throne, Suffield was made a Lord-in-Waiting-in-Ordinary to the King. He was Master of the Robes at the coronation of Edward VII and Alexandra in 1902.

Harbord served as President of Marylebone Cricket Club (MCC) in 1863.

Family
Lord Suffield married firstly Cecilia Annetta Baring, daughter of Henry Baring, on 4 May 1854. They had two sons and nine daughters:

 Charles Harbord, 6th Baron Suffield (14 June 1855 – 10 February 1924).
 Hon. Cecilia Margaret Harbord (15 June 1856 – 6 October 1934), married Charles Wynn-Carington, 1st Marquess of Lincolnshire, and had issue.
 Hon. Alice Marion Harbord (23 June 1857 – 1940), married Charles Mills, 2nd Baron Hillingdon, and had issue.
 Hon. Mabel Harbord (21 November 1858 – 11 February 1860).
Hon. Elizabeth Evelyn Harbord (23 February 1860 – 19 February 1957), married George Astley, 20th Baron Hastings.
 Assheton Edward Harbord (20 January 1861, Harlestone, Northamptonshire – 18 July 1929) married aeronaut May Constance Blackwood
 Hon. Judith Harbord (12 June 1862, Gunton Park, Norfolk – 4 February 1942).
 Hon. Winifred Harbord (31 December 1864, Gunton, Norfolk – 6 January 1949), married in 1889 Captain Geoffry Carr Glyn.
 Hon. Eleanor Harbord (7 January 1868, Gunton, Norfolk – 12 July 1936)
Hon. Bridget Louisa Harbord (20 December 1870 – 24 September 1951), married Sir Derek Keppel.

Lady Suffield died in 1911. Lord Suffield married secondly, aged 81, Frances Amelia Jessie Eliot Gabbett, daughter of Major Robert Pool Gabbett, in August 1911. Lord Suffield was also President of the Royal Cromer golf club in 1887 (in fact Suffield was the landlord of the golf club' land). His son and grandsons were also members of the club and land owners. A substantial landowner, he owned 12,000 acres and had seats at Gunton Park, Norwich, and Harbord House, Cromer. His London residence was at 129 St George's Road. Lord Suffield died in April 1914, aged 84, and was succeeded by his eldest son, Charles.

Honours and arms
 17 February 1886 : Appointed to the Privy Council of the United Kingdom by Queen Victoria
 17 May 1876 : Knight Commander of the Order of the Bath, KCB
8 March 1901 : Knight Grand Cross of the Royal Victorian Order, GCVO

References

1830 births
1914 deaths
People educated at King's College School, London
Members of the Privy Council of the United Kingdom
Liberal Party (UK) Lords-in-Waiting
Knights Grand Cross of the Royal Victorian Order
Knights Commander of the Order of the Bath
Presidents of the Marylebone Cricket Club
People from North Norfolk (district)
Masters of the Buckhounds
Charles 05